The 30th Saskatchewan general election will be held on or before October 28, 2024 to elect members of the Legislative Assembly of Saskatchewan.

Background
Since 2010, the Legislative Assembly has had a fixed four-year term. According to the 2019 amendment to the Legislative Assembly Act, 2007, "the first general election after the coming into force of this subsection must be held on Monday, October 26, 2020". Subsequent elections, must occur "on the last Monday of October in the fourth calendar year after the last general election". However, the act also provides that if the election period would overlap with a federal election period, the provincial election is to be postponed until the first Monday of the following April; in this case: April 7, 2025. The fixed election law does not infringe on the Lieutenant Governor's right to dissolve the Legislative Assembly at an earlier date on the Premier's advice.

Legislative summary
Summary of the 28th Legislative Assembly of Saskatchewan
|-
!rowspan="2" colspan="2"|Party
!rowspan="2"|Leader
!colspan="2"|Seats
|-
!2020
!Current

|align=left|Scott Moe
|48 ||48

|align=left|Carla Beck
|13 ||12

|align=left|Nadine Wilson
|– ||1
|-
|
| style="text-align:left;" colspan="2"|Total
|61 ||61
|}

Timeline

2020
October 26: The Saskatchewan Party wins a majority government in the 2020 Saskatchewan general election. The Saskatchewan New Democratic Party (NDP) forms the official opposition. No other parties won seats in the election.

2021
 August 10: Athabasca MLA Buckley Belanger (NDP) resigned his seat to seek a federal Liberal nomination in the 2021 Canadian federal election.
 September 30: MLA Nadine Wilson resigned from the Sask. Party caucus after misrepresenting her COVID-19 vaccination status, becoming an independent MLA.

2022
 February 15: Sask. Party candidate Jim Lemaigre won the 2022 Athabasca provincial by-election.

 February 18: Ryan Meili announced his intention to resign as NDP leader. He intends to remain leader until a successor is chosen.

May 19: Ryan Meili announces his intention to resign as the MLA for Saskatoon Meewasin, effective July 1.

June 26: Carla Beck is elected as Leader of the Saskatchewan NDP.

September 26: Nathaniel Teed is elected as the MLA for Saskatoon Meewasin by the largest margin of victory in Saskatoon Meewasin since 1982.

November 30: The Saskatchewan United Party is registered with Elections Saskatchewan, with MLA Nadine Wilson its leader.

2023
February 10: Regina Coronation Park MLA Mark Docherty resigns his seat, triggering a by-election within six months.

Opinion polls

Opinion poll sources

References

Elections in Saskatchewan
Saskatchewan